Twin Glacier is a glacier in northwestern British Columbia, Canada, located on the northern and eastern flanks of Hoodoo Mountain. It lies at the headwaters of the Twin River. The glacier originates from the Andrei Icefield.

See also
List of glaciers in Canada
Hoodoo Glacier

References

External links

Glaciers of British Columbia
Boundary Ranges
Cassiar Land District